José Luis Vega (born June 18, 1948) is a Puerto Rican poet.

Vega was born in Santurce, Puerto Rico to José Vega Serrano and Aida Esther Colón Rivera. He studied in Santurce public schools, graduating from Central High School in 1964. That year he entered the University of Puerto Rico, where he completed undergraduate studies in social sciences. He subsequently began studies in philosophy, then left them to pursue a specialization in Hispanic studies. He completed a master's degree in art in 1975, with a thesis on the poetry of César Vallejo. In 1982, he completed a Ph.D. with the dissertation La poesía de Oliverio Girondo: Vanguardia y tradición.

Collections of Vega's poetry include:

 Comienzo del canto (1969)
 Signos vitales (1974)
 Las natas de los párpados (1976)
 La naranja entera (1983)
 Tiempo de bolero (1985)
 Bajo los effectos de la poesía (1986)
 Solo de pasión/Teoría del sueño (1996)

In 2002, the Spanish publishing house Visor published an anthology of Vega's poetry entitled Letra viva. His book of poems, Sínsoras (2013) was published in Mexico by Seix Barral. Madrid's Estampa Gallery published Botella al mar (2013), an artist's book illustrated by Oscar Lagunas. In 2014, Vega published El arpa olvidada: Guía para la lectura de la poesía (Pre-Textos, Spain), an essay on poetry that can be considered Vega's poetic creed. In 2016, the same Valencian publisher released Música de fondo, Vega's most recent collection.

In the prologue to Letra viva, Julio Ortega considers José Luis Vega as the best poet in his country, the privileged product of the great poetic tradition that has made that island a term of the sums of Spain and America, between classical forms and worldly eloquence. The poetry of José Luis Vega has been translated into English, French, Portuguese, Romanian and Russian. He is also author of the collection of essays and poems, Techo a dos aguas (Plaza Mayor, 1998), and of several literary studies among them César Vallejo in Trilce (1983), La visión trágica en la poesía de Pablo Neruda, essay that forms part of The Commemorative Edition of the work of the Chilean poet published by the Real Academia Española (Royal Spanish Academy) and the Asociación de Academias de la Lengua Española (2010) (Association of Academies of the Spanish Language) and Coloquio de los centauros: Poética the Rubén Darío, in Rubén Darío: del símbolo a la realidad, which also is part of another Commemorative Edition of the Real Academia Española (2016).

For his cultural achievements, Vega has been distinguished with the Order of Isabel the Catholic (Grade of Commander), with the Medal of the Foundation Ricardo Alegría and with the Order to the Educational and Cultural Merit Gabriela Mistral (Grade of Commander). He is a corresponding academic of the Real Academia Española and the academies of the Spanish language of the United States, Dominican Republic and Bolivia.

José Luis Vega's poems have been included in important anthologies of poetry in Spanish, among others Los 100 grandes poemas de España y América, compiled by Julio Ortega and published by the publisher Siglo XXI. His poetry has been translated into English, French, Portuguese, Romanian and Russian. On the poetry of José Luis Vega two books have been published: Tiempo de poesía: La palabra de José Luis Vega, by María Teresa Bertelloni and La experiencia cuántica en la poesía de José Luis Vega, by Bruno Rosario Candelier.

José Luis Vega is the current director of the Academia Puertorriqueña de la Lengua Española (Puerto Rican Academy of the Spanish Language), he has been a professor at the University of Puerto Rico, director of the Department of Hispanic Studies, dean of the Faculty of Humanities and director of the Institute of Puerto Rican Culture.

Publications 
 Comienzo del canto, Yaurel, San Juan, 1965.
 Signos vitales, Cultural, San Juan, 1974.
 Suite erótica, Ventana, San Juan, 1976.
 Visión (separata con un poema). Ediciones Miljevik, Argentina, 1976.
 La naranja entera, Cultural, 1983.
 César Vallejo en Trilce, Universidad de Puerto Rico, 1983.
 Tiempo de bolero, Cultural, San Juan, 1985.
 Bajo los efectos de la poesía, Cultural, UPR, 1989.
 Solo de pasión/Teoría del sueño, ICP, San Juan, 1996.
 Techo a dos aguas, Plaza Mayor, San Juan 1998). 
 Tres entradas para Porto Rico. Brasil: Fundação Memorial da América, 2000.
 Letra viva (antología), Visor, Madrid, 2002.
 Sínsoras, Seix Barral, México, 2013.
 Golpe de tambor (separata con un poema), Fundación SM, San Juan, 2013.
 Botella al mar (con ilustraciones de Óscar Lagunas), Estampa, Madrid, 2014.
 El arpa olvidada (Guía para la lectura de la poesía), Pre-Textos, Valencia: 2014.
 Música de fondo Pre-Textos, Madrid, Buenos Aires, Valencia, 2016.

Other publications 
 Reunión de espejos, (Antología del cuento puertorriqueño actual). Río Piedras,  Cultural, 1983.
 Pensamiento y comunicación (Serie para la enseñanza del español en la escuela intermedia y superior, con la colaboración de María Vaquero y Humberto López Morales), Río Piedras: Plaza Mayor, 1998,
 Gramática actual del español (en colaboración con Amparo Morales). San Juan, SM, 2011
 Gramática didáctica del español (en colaboración con Amparo Morales), San   Juan: SM, 2014

See also

 List of Puerto Rican writers
List of Puerto Ricans
 Puerto Rican literature
 Caribbean poetry

References 
 Ortega, Julio. El logos concurrente de José Luis Vega. Ciudad Literaria, 7 de    febrero 2006. http://blogs.brown.edu/ciudad_literaria/2006/02/07/el-logos- concurrente-de-jose-luis-vega/
 Cabrera, Fernando. Las hondas raíces de la sensibilidad de José Luis Vega. Cuaderno de Bitácora (blog). 25 de enero de 2014. http://cabrerafernando.blogspot.com/2014/01/sinsoras-las-hondas-raices-de- la.html
 Rosario Candelier, Bruno. Experiencia cuántica y vivienda metafísica en el poemario Sínsoras, de José Luis Vega. República Dominicana, Interiorismo Literario, Ateneo Insular http://www.interiorismoliterario.com/ateneo/index.php/61-experiencia-cuantica-y-vivencia-metafisica-en-el-poemario-sinsoras
 Andrés Glez. Déniz. El arpa olvidada: [Fragmentos extraídos de Vega, José Luis:   El arpa olvidada (Guía de lectura de la poesía). Valencia, Pre-Textos, 2014, 1ª edición, pp. 159]”. El desván de la ilusión (blog). http://eldesvandelailusion.blogspot.com/2015/04/el-cisne-de-la-cima- rosada- enlas.html
 Barradas, Efraín. Cisne, fénix, pájara pinta: José Luis Vega y la poesía”. 80 grados. (12 agosto 2015).  http://www.80grados.net/cisne-fenix-pajara-pinta-jose-  luis-vega-y-la-poesia/
 Iglesias, Julio César. El arpa olvidada. La soga. Revista Cultural. (27 de marzo 2015). http://lasoga.org/el-arpa-olvidada/
 Martínez, José Enrique. Cuánta nota dormía en sus cuerdas: El arpa olvidada, de   José Luis Vega. El diario de León.es, 8 de febrero 2015. http://www.diariodeleon.es/noticias/filandon/cuanta-nota-dormia-sus-%20cuerdas_955281.html  
 Perez Alencart, Alfredo. José Luis Vega y le valor de la poesía. Salamanca al día. (7 de julio 2015).  http://salamancartvaldia.es/not/85258/-jose-luis-vaga-y-elvalor-de-la-poesia/.
 Montesinos, Toni. José Luis Vega: la energía creativa del idioma. Barcelona: La razón.es. 15 de marzo de 2016. http://www.larazon.es/etiquetas/noticias/meta/luis-pales-matos.
 Villena, Luis Antonio. El español de Puerto Rico. Madrid: El Mundo, (9 de marzo 2016). http://www.elmundo.es/cultura/2016/03/006/56df2e82e2704e697f8b4624.html

External links
 brief biography
 A conversation about Spanish-American poetry with Vega, José Marmol, and Pedro Granados
 Palabras de clausura del VII CILE, 18 de marzo de 2016. http://www.asale.org/sites/default/files/Jose_Luis_Vega_Clausura_VII_CILE.pdf
 «Un león doliente guarda la tumba de Rubén Darío». Presentación de la edición conmemorativa de Rubén Darío. San Juan de Puerto Rico, 18 de marzo de 2016. http://www.asale.org/sites/default/files/Palabras_de_Jose_Luis_Vega_para_la_conmemorativa.pdf
 Francisco Rico y Pierre Menard. Palabras en la presentación de la edición conmemorativa de 2015 del Quijote, en el marco del XV Congreso de la Asociación de Academias de Lengua Española, 25 de noviembre de 2015, Colegio de México. http://www.asale.org/sites/default/files/Presentacion_Quijote.pdf
 Entrevista [audio]. 22 eñes. Radio Nacional de España, 7 de marzo de 2015.http://www.rtve.es/alacarta/live_audio_PopUp.shtml?idAudio=3037246&lang=es&v=0.75 
 Entrevista a José Luis Vega. Proyecto Letral. 2011. http://www.asale.org/sites/default/files/A_Vega_Proyecto_Letral.pdf

Living people
People from Santurce, Puerto Rico
Puerto Rican poets
Puerto Rican male writers
1948 births
20th-century American poets
20th-century American male writers
20th-century Puerto Rican poets
21st-century Puerto Rican poets